Wild Cactus is a 1993 erotic thriller film directed by Jag Mundhra and starring David Naughton, India Allen, Gary Hudson, Kathy Shower, Bubba Baker, Robert Z'Dar, and Paul Gleason. It was released direct to video on 24 March 1993.

Plot 
Philip (David Naughton) and Alexandria (India Allen) are a married couple that have decided to spend their vacation at a friend's house in the Arizona desert. Their marriage has hit a rough patch due to Philip's work, which has monopolized his time and left Alexandra feeling lonely. Additionally, Alex is encouraged to cheat on her husband by a close friend, which she considers. She's further dismayed when she finds that Philip is still too busy to pay attention to her and pushes him to go to a night bar.

Once there the two quickly run into some trouble with a biker, but are saved from harm by Randall (Gary Hudson) and Maggie (Michelle Moffett). They give the two a ride to a trailer park, unaware that Randall is there to get revenge against his ex-girlfriend Celeste (Kathy Shower), who sent him to jail, and that Maggie is a prostitute that Randall has brought along by force. Randall manages to break into the trailer, which terrifies Celeste. Despite his assurances that he is not there to harm her, Randall forces Maggie to kill Celeste.

The following morning the two arrive at Alexandria and Philip's vacation home, as Randall had promised to help Philip look for plants for his job. The two men leave to look for plants, only for Randall to push Philip off a cliff. Believing the man to be dead, Randall drives off, unaware that Philip survived and has begun walking back in order to rescue his wife. Meanwhile, back at the house, Alexandria has grown increasingly suspicious that Maggie is a wanted criminal, and at one point tries to call the police, but is interrupted by Maggie. When Randall returns without Philip, Alexandria, driven by a desire to survive and a desire to have an extramarital affair with a dangerous, sexy man, tries to turn the couple against one another by having sex with them both. After having sex with Randall, and realizing she really enjoyed it, Alexandra attempts to run away with him, but to no avail.

On his way back to the house, Philip finds his way to Celeste's trailer park and discovers her dead body. Soon after, he is found by the town's Sheriff Brenner (Paul Gleason), who takes Philip back to the vacation house after hearing his story. They arrive at the house and sneak into it in an attempt to save Alexandria. Maggie, who has decided that she is no longer going to follow Randall, is accidentally shot by the sheriff, who is then killed by Randall. Randall then tries to chase after Alexandria, only for her to later turn the tables on him and shoot him. Finally safe, Philip and Alexandria embrace.

Cast 

 David Naughton as Philip Marcus
 India Allen as Alexandria 'Alex' Marcus
 Gary Hudson as Randall Murphy
 Kathy Shower as Celeste
 Bubba Baker as Drunk
 Robert Z'Dar as Officer Grady
 Paul Gleason as Sheriff Brenner
 Michelle Moffett as Maggie
 Anna Karin as Inga
 Wendy MacDonald as Abby
 Warren Sweeney as Gas Mart Clerk
 David Wells as Salesman
 Ric Stoneback as Bartender
 Faith Jones as Prison Clerk
 Jay Polan as Dean
 Carrie Chambers as Waitress

Reception
TV Guide panned the film for its lack of plot and wrote "Director Jag Mundhra made one of the better direct-to-video sex thrillers, NIGHT EYES, in 1990, but never learned the lesson that a good script is the best aphrodisiac." Allmovie also rated the film poorly and gave it one star.

References

External links
 

1993 films
1990s erotic thriller films
American erotic thriller films
1990s English-language films
Films directed by Jag Mundhra
1990s American films